District 7 could refer to:

District 7, Ho Chi Minh City, Vietnam
District 7 (Zürich), Switzerland
District 7, Düsseldorf, Germany
VII District, Turku, Finland
District 7 School (Groton, Massachusetts), United States
District 7 School (Hanson, Massachusetts), United States
 District 7, an electoral district of Malta
 District 7, a police district of Malta

See also
Area 7 (disambiguation)
District 6 (disambiguation)
District 8 (disambiguation)
Sector 7 (disambiguation)